"Our Lips Are Sealed" is a song co-written by Jane Wiedlin, guitarist of the Go-Go's, and Terry Hall, singer of the Specials and Fun Boy Three.

It was first recorded by the Go-Go's as the opening track on their album Beauty and the Beat (1981) and was their debut American single in June 1981. The single eventually reached the top 5 in Australia and Canada, and the top 20 in the United States. Originally written and performed with three verses, the song appears in an abbreviated version on Beauty and the Beat. Most of the song's vocals are performed by lead singer Belinda Carlisle, with co-writer Wiedlin singing the bridge.

In 1983, Hall's band Fun Boy Three released their version of "Our Lips Are Sealed". Issued as a single, the track became a top-ten hit in the United Kingdom, besting the recording by the Go-Go's which only made it to No. 47 in the UK.

Record World described the song as being as "innocent and infectious as pop music can be," with a "steady, pulsating dance beat" and "candy-coated keyboard riffs."

In 2000, Rolling Stone & MTV put the Go-Go's' original version of "Our Lips Are Sealed" at No. 57 on a list of 100 Greatest Pop Songs. In 2021, their version was also listed at No. 477 on Rolling Stone's 500 Greatest Songs of All Time. The Go-Go's performed the song, along with "Vacation" and "We Got the Beat", during the 2021 Rock and Roll Hall of Fame Induction Ceremony.

Origins
The Go-Go's supported the Specials on the latter's 1980 Seaside tour of England. According to Jane Wiedlin, she and Terry Hall had a brief affair despite his being in a relationship with another woman at the time. After Wiedlin returned to the United States, Hall mailed her some lyrics, and this led to their co-writing the song. The Go-Go's version is significantly more upbeat than Fun Boy Three's, which Wiedlin describes as "great" but also "gloomier".

Music video
The official music video for the song features sequences of the band members in carefree tableaux (riding around LA in a 1960 Buick convertible, stopping at a lingerie shop, and splashing around in a fountain) interspersed with footage of the band playing at a club.

Jane Wiedlin says the band was initially unenthusiastic when Miles Copeland, president of their label, I.R.S. Records, told them they would be doing the video. "We were totally bratty," she recalls. The video was financed with unused funds from the Police's video budget.

The group wanted an older-style convertible, and found a red 1960 Buick LeSabre at Rent-a-Wreck. After riding around Beverly Hills, at some point, they stop at the famous Trashy Lingerie store located at La Cienega Blvd. The girls go into the shop, but Jane Wiedlin remains in the car to sing the bridge of the song (although Carlisle can be seen in the driver's seat trying to hide). The day of shooting was very hot so it was the band's idea to end the video by jumping into the fountain on the corner of Wilshire and Santa Monica. Wiedlin later said "I thought, at any minute the cops are gonna come. This is gonna be so cool."

Wiedlin looks back on the video experience fondly. "I have horrible '80s poodle hair in it," she recalled in a 2011 history of MTV. "But there's a simplicity and innocence to the video that appeals to me."

The music video received heavy airplay on the fledgling MTV.

Chart performance
The original version peaked at number 20 on the Billboard Hot 100 chart, and 15 on the Billboard Top Rock Tracks chart. On the dance chart, the song peaked at number 10. A song of unusual longevity as a hit, it remained on the Billboard charts until March 1982, long after its peak, ultimately charting for 30 weeks.

Weekly charts

Certifications and sales

Year-end charts

Fun Boy Three version

The following year, co-writer Terry Hall re-recorded the song with his own band, Fun Boy Three. It was included on their second album Waiting and reached number seven on the UK Singles Chart, and was the last single to chart in the UK before their split later in 1983. Backing vocals were provided by Mo-dettes drummer June Miles-Kingston, who also played drums on the single and the Waiting LP.

2x7" single (Chrysalis FUNB 1 + FBFRE 1)

12" single (Chrysalis 4V9-42689)

12" UK single (Chrysalis FUNBX 1)

Hilary and Haylie Duff version

Sisters Hilary and Haylie Duff covered the song for the soundtrack of the 2004 film A Cinderella Story, in which Hilary starred. The cover, which was released on June 5, 2004, was produced by Charlie Midnight and Spider. The Duff sisters said in an interview that they had wanted to record together, and Hilary chose "Our Lips Are Sealed" because the "secretive" theme of the song relates to the film A Cinderella Story. As of July 27, 2014, the song had sold 161,000 copies in the United States. It was released on June 3 and received medium airplay on MuchMusic in Canada and MTV in the U.S. Though the video was popular on the MTV video chart show Total Request Live, the single failed to chart on the US Hot 100. In Australia it was released on August 30, 2004 and reached number eight.

The single's music video was directed by Chris Applebaum and filmed in Toronto, Canada, in May 2004. Similar to the video for the Go-Go's single, it depicts the Duff sisters driving around town in a car and goofing about, and is interspersed with footage from A Cinderella Story. A second version of the video, which had new scenes and is not interspersed with scenes from A Cinderella Story, was included on the Dignity deluxe edition DVD. The song was included on Duff's compilation album, Most Wanted (2005) and the Japanese and Australian editions of Hilary Duff's second compilation album Best of Hilary Duff.

Track listing
"Our Lips Are Sealed" – 2:40
"Our Lips Are Sealed" (music video) – 2:50
A Cinderella Story movie trailer – 1:44

Charts

Release history

References

External links

1981 songs
1981 debut singles
1983 singles
2004 singles
The Go-Go's songs
Fun Boy Three songs
Haylie Duff songs
Hilary Duff songs
Hollywood Records singles
I.R.S. Records singles
Chrysalis Records singles
Music videos directed by Chris Applebaum
Song recordings produced by David Byrne
Songs written by Jane Wiedlin
Songs written by Terry Hall (singer)
Female vocal duets